Strömtorps IK is a Swedish football club located in the neighbourhood of Strömtorp in Degerfors.

Background
Strömtorps Idrottsklubb is a sports club from Degerfors. The club was formed in April 1932 and football and skiing are its main sections.

Since their foundation Strömtorps IK has participated mainly in the middle and lower divisions of the Swedish football league system.  The club currently plays in Division 3 Västra Svealand which is the fifth tier of Swedish football. They play their home matches at the Strömtorps IP in Degerfors.

Strömtorps IK are affiliated to Värmlands Fotbollförbund.

Recent history
In recent seasons Strömtorps IK have competed in the following divisions:

2011 – Division III, Västra Svealand
2010 – Division IV, Värmland
2009 – Division IV, Värmland
2008 – Division IV, Värmland
2007 – Division III, Västra Svealand
2006 – Division III, Västra Svealand
2005 – Division III, Västra Svealand
2004 – Division III, Västra Svealand
2003 – Division II, Västra Svealand
2002 – Division III, Västra Svealand
2001 – Division IV, Värmland
2000 – Division IV, Värmland
1999 – Division IV, Värmland

Attendances

In recent seasons Strömtorps IK have had the following average attendances:

Notable Managers
  Ulf Ottosson

Footnotes

External links
 Strömtorps IK – Official website
 Strömtorps IK on Facebook

Football clubs in Värmland County
Association football clubs established in 1932
1932 establishments in Sweden